Korzenno  is a village in the administrative district of Gmina Raków, within Kielce County, Świętokrzyskie Voivodeship, in south-central Poland.

The village has a population of 116.

References

Korzenno